Béchir Ben Slama (14 October 1931 – 26 February 2023) was a Tunisian writer and politician.

Biography
Born in Le Bardo on 14 October 1931, Ben Slama attended primary and secondary school at Sadiki College. He then began teaching at the  but quit in 1963 to pursue a political career.

Ben Slama was elected to the Chamber of Deputies in 1969, where he remained for three terms. He became a leader within the Socialist Destourian Party in 1980. On 2 January 1981, he was appointed Minister of Culture. During his mandate, he established the Tunisian Academy of Sciences, Letters, and Arts and the National Theatre of Tunisia. He left his position on 12 May 1986.

Béchir Ben Slama died on 26 February 2023, at the age of 91.

References

1931 births
2023 deaths
20th-century Tunisian politicians
Tunisian writers
Members of the Chamber of Deputies (Tunisia)
Government ministers of Tunisia
Culture ministers
Members of the Tunisian Academy of Sciences, Letters, and Arts
Neo Destour politicians
Socialist Destourian Party politicians
Alumni of Sadiki College
People from Tunis Governorate